Prendilo tu questo frutto amaro is a music album by Italian singer Antonello Venditti, released in 1995.

Track listing
"Ogni volta" - 4.59 (A. Venditti)
"Tutti all'inferno" - 5.08 (A. Venditti)
"Vento selvaggio" - 5.04 (A. Venditti)
"Eroi minori" - 4.51 (A. Venditti)
"Prendilo tu questo frutto amaro" - 5.15 (A. Venditti, S. Van Zandt)
"Parla come baci" - 5.27 (A. Venditti, L. Anastasi, D. Cherni, A. Lo Giudice, M. Perfetto)
"A che gioco giochi" - 5.03 (A. Venditti)
"1000 figli" - 4.44 (A. Venditti)

Charts

References

Antonello Venditti albums
1995 albums